Todos sus Éxitos is the fourth Spanish language album by Brazilian singer, television presenter and actress Xuxa. It was released in 1993.

Production 
Todos sus Éxitos was produced by Michael Sullivan, Paulo Massadas and Guto Graça Mello.

Release and reception 
Todos sus Éxitos was released in 1993, of the hits hits the most famous songs of the albums Xuxa 1, Xuxa 2 and Xuxa 3, being that the first two reached the fourth and seventh position in Billboard Latin Pop Albums respectively, being that the second remained in the table by 27 weeks among the best sellers of according to Billboard magazine. In Argentina, Todos sus Éxitos debuted in second place among the top 10, according to the publication.

Track listing

Personnel
Produced: Michael Sullivan, Paulo Massadas and Guto Graça Mello
Recording and mixing technician: Jorge "Gordo" Guimarães
Xuxa's Spanish voice direction: Graciela Carballo
Artistic Coordination: Max Pierre and Guto Graça Mello

Chart

Certifications

Release history

References

External links 
 Todos sus Éxitos at Discogs

Xuxa albums
1993 greatest hits albums
Spanish-language compilation albums